The 1975 Philadelphia Eagles season was the franchise’s 43rd in the National Football League. 1975 was the third season under head coach Mike McCormack, but became the Eagles’ ninth consecutive season without a winning record. The Eagles also missed the playoffs for a fifteenth consecutive season, a franchise record. Following the season, McCormack was fired and replaced for 1976 by Dick Vermeil.

Offseason

NFL Draft

Player selections 
The table shows the Eagles selections and what picks they had that were traded away and the team that ended up with that pick. It is possible the Eagles' pick ended up with this team via another team that the Eagles made a trade with.
Not shown are acquired picks that the Eagles traded away.

Roster

Regular season

Schedule 

Note: Intra-division opponents are in bold text.

Game summaries

Week 1: vs. New York Giants 

    
    
    
    
    
    

The Eagles lose this game, the first of ten losses during their season.

Week 2: at Chicago Bears 

 Source:

Week 3: vs. Washington Redskins 

    
    
    
    
    
    
    

Eagles’ head coach Mike McCormack had called his team out for “dogging it” prior to the game.

Week 4: at Miami Dolphins 

 Source:

Week 5: at St. Louis Cardinals 

 Source:

Week 6: vs. Dallas Cowboys

Week 7: vs. Los Angeles Rams

Week 8: vs. St. Louis Cardinals

Week 9: at New York Giants 

 Source:

Week 10: at Dallas Cowboys 

 Source:

Week 11: vs. San Francisco 49ers

Week 12: vs. Cincinnati Bengals 

    
    
    
    
    

The game was featured in the beginning of the 2006 film Invincible.

Week 13: at Denver Broncos 

 Source:

Week 14: at Washington Redskins 

 Source:

Standings

Notes

References

External links 
 
 1975 Eagles on jt-sw.com
 1975 Eagles on Eagles.net

Philadelphia Eagles seasons
Philadelphia Eagles
Philadel